PURS may refer to:

 Battle of Juba (2013)
 Battle of Juba (2016)
 2018 Juba raid